The 1949 Vanderbilt Commodores football team represented Vanderbilt University during the 1949 college football season. The team's head coach was Bill Edwards, who served his first season as the Commodores' head coach.  Vanderbilt went 5–5 with a record of 4–4 in Southeastern Conference play.  The Commodores played their six home games at Dudley Field in Nashville, Tennessee.

Schedule

References

Vanderbilt
Vanderbilt Commodores football seasons
Vanderbilt Commodores football